The Ambassador of the United Kingdom to Turkey is the United Kingdom's foremost diplomatic representative to the Republic of Turkey, and head of the UK's diplomatic mission in Ankara.  The official title is His Britannic Majesty's Ambassador to the Republic of Turkey.

Besides the embassy in Ankara, the United Kingdom also maintains a consulate general in Istanbul.

List of heads of mission

Ambassadors to Turkey
For the period up to foundation of the Turkish Republic, see List of Ambassadors from the United Kingdom to the Ottoman Empire.

1920–1924: Sir Horace Rumbold, 9th Baronet (British Commissioner at Constantinople)
1925–1926: Sir Ronald Lindsay
1926–1933: Sir George Clerk
1933–1939: Sir Percy Loraine, 12th Baronet
1939–1944: Sir Hughe Knatchbull-Hugessen
1944–1946: Sir Maurice Peterson
1946–1949: Sir David Kelly
1949–1951: Sir Noel Charles
1951–1954: Sir Knox Helm
1954–1958: Sir James Bowker
1958–1962: Sir Bernard Burrows
1963–1967: Sir Denis Allen
1967–1969: Sir Roger Allen
1969–1972: Sir Roderick Sarell
1973–1977: Sir Horace Phillips
1977–1980: Sir Derek Dodson
1980–1983: Sir Peter Laurence
1983–1986: Sir Mark Russell
1986–1992: Sir Timothy Daunt
1992–1995: John Goulden
1995–1997: Sir Kieran Prendergast
1997–2001: Sir David Logan
2002–2006: Sir Peter Westmacott
2006–2009: Nick Baird
2009–2014: Sir David Reddaway
2014–2017: Richard Moore

2018–: Sir Dominick Chilcott

References

External links
British Embassy Ankara

Turkey
United Kingdom